Anachloris subochraria (also known as Australian yellow or Willowherb yellow) is a species of moth of the family Geometridae. It is found in New Zealand and the southern half of Australia including Tasmania and from Queensland across to Western Australia. This moth is day flying and can be found in New Zealand on the wing between November and April.

A. subochraria was first described by Edward Doubleday in 1843.

The wingspan is about 30 mm.

The larvae feed on Hibbertia species. In New Zealand the larvae have been observed feeding on the naturalised weed, ragwort (Jacobaea vulgaris).

References

External links

 Citizen Science observations of species
 Images of caterpillar lifestage

Hydriomenini
Moths of Australia
Moths of New Zealand
Moths of Queensland
Moths described in 1843